Yekkeh Bid (also Romanized as Yekkeh Bīd) is a village in Golbibi Rural District, Marzdaran District, Sarakhs County, Razavi Khorasan Province, Iran. At the 2006 census, its population was 98, in 26 families.

References 

Populated places in Sarakhs County